The Girls’ 100 m competition at the 2014 Summer Youth Olympics was held on 21–23 August 2014. The event took place in Nanjing Olympic Sports Center, Nanjing, China.

Schedule

Results

Heats
Eight fastest athletes advanced to Final A, the others advanced to Final B, C, or D according to their times.

Finals

Final A

Final B

Final C

Final D

References

External links
 iaaf.org - Women 100m
 Nanjing 2014 - Athletics Official Results Book

Athletics at the 2014 Summer Youth Olympics
2014